Creative Assembly Sofia (formerly Black Sea Studios and Crytek Black Sea) is a Bulgarian video game developer based in Sofia. It was founded in May 2001 by Vesselin Handjiev. In July 2008, the company was acquired by Crytek, which then sold it to Creative Assembly in March 2017.

History 
Black Sea Studios was founded by Vesselin Handjiev, the lead designer of Tzar: The Burden of the Crown, on 7 May 2001 in Sofia, Bulgaria. At the time, the company began developing three separate games: two real-time strategy games and one arcade-style action game. The company became known for its 2004 title Knights of Honor, a historical real-time strategy game released for Microsoft Windows, and for the 2008 science fiction real-time strategy title WorldShift.

In July 2008, German developer and publisher Crytek announced their acquisition of the studio, and renamed it Crytek Black Sea. At the time, Black Sea Studios was based in Sofia, Bulgaria, with Vesselin Handijev was managing director. In May 2014, Crytek announced the development of their own multiplayer online battle arena game using the CryEngine, titled Arena of Fate and under development at the Sofia studio. The game was shown at E3 2014. In November 2016, founder Handjiev, together with Michael Peykov, formed a new video game company, Black Sea Games.

In December 2016, Crytek announced that it would shut down five of its international studios, due to financial troubles, of which Crytek Black Sea was put up for sale. In March 2017, it was announced that the studio was acquired by British developer Creative Assembly (itself owned by Sega), and was renamed Creative Assembly Sofia. At the time, Crytek Black Sea had 60 employees. Under Creative Assembly, Creative Assembly Sofia developed downloadable content for Total War: Rome II, including Empire Divided and Rise of the Republic. It also developed a new game in the Total War Saga series, Total War Saga: Troy.

In 2016, some of the people from Black Sea Studios founded Black Sea Games, which is now developing Knights of Honor II: Sovereign, a sequel to Knights of Honor.

Games developed

Cancelled 
 Arena of Fate

References 

Bulgarian companies established in 2001
2008 mergers and acquisitions
2017 mergers and acquisitions
Companies based in Sofia
Crytek
Sega divisions and subsidiaries
Video game companies established in 2001
Video game companies of Bulgaria
Video game development companies